The National Plant Collection scheme is the main conservation vehicle whereby the Plant Heritage charity (formerly the  National Council for the Conservation of Plants and Gardens) can accomplish its mission: to conserve, grow, propagate, document and make available the resource of garden plants that exists in the United Kingdom.

With the National Plant Collections, individuals or organisations undertake to document, develop, and preserve a comprehensive collection of one group of plants in trust for the future. Most of the collections are composed of a related group, for example, a collection of oaks or daffodils. This allows the scheme to develop systematic coverage of cultivated plants in the United Kingdom. A few National Collections are of plants introduced by a prolific nursery or plant hunter; for example, the Sir Harold Hillier Gardens and Arboretum hold a collection of Hillier's introductions.

Collection holders voluntarily subscribe to the scheme's ideals and stringent requirements. They come from every sector of horticulture, both amateur and professional.

Almost half of the collections are in private ownership and include allotments, back gardens and large estates. Just under a third are found in nurseries, which range from large commercial concerns to the small specialist grower. Twenty-one local authorities are involved in the scheme, including Leeds City Council, caring for eleven collections, and Bournemouth Borough Council with their Abelia and Clethra collections.

Universities, agricultural colleges, schools, arboreta (e.g. Bedgebury Pinetum) and botanic gardens (the Royal Botanic Gardens, Kew, Glasgow Botanic Gardens and both Oxford and Cambridge) all add to the diversity. There are also a number of collections on properties belonging to English Heritage, the National Trust and the National Trust for Scotland.

References

External links
 Plant Heritage website

Conservation in the United Kingdom
Gardening in the United Kingdom